Gangula Prathapa Reddy is an Indian politician. He was elected to the Lok Sabha, the lower house of the Parliament of India from Nandyal in Andhra Pradesh as a member of the Indian National Congress in 1991. But he resigned the seat to enable the then Prime Minister P. V. Narasimha Rao to contest a by election and get elected to parliament.

References

External links
Official biographical sketch in Parliament of India website

1950 births
Living people
Lok Sabha members from Andhra Pradesh
Indian National Congress politicians
India MPs 1991–1996
People from Kurnool district